TV 2 Sport launched as a channel in Denmark on 9 January 2015 by TV 2.

References

2015 establishments in Denmark
2015 in Danish television
Television channels and stations established in 2015
Television stations in Denmark
Sports television in Denmark